This is a list of past and present members of the Senate of Canada representing the province of Manitoba.

Manitoba can be represented by up to six senators, but this was not always the case. Stipulated in the Manitoba Act of 1870, the province was first represented by two senators, then to increase incrementally based on population, when the population reached 75,000 it would then be represented by a maximum of four senators. The Constitution Act of 1915 added two more senate seats for Manitoba, bringing the total to six.

The Constitution Act of 1915 also amended Section 26 of the Constitution Act of 1867 to add a fourth regional division, called the Western provinces, made up of British Columbia, Alberta, Saskatchewan and Manitoba, to allow two senators to be appointed on a regional basis.

Current senators

Notes:

1 Party listed is the Senator's current party.
2 Senators are appointed to represent Manitoba. Each senator may choose to designate a geographic area within Manitoba as his or her division.
3 Senators are appointed by the Governor-General of Canada on the recommendation of the prime minister.

Historical

Notes:

1 Party listed was the last party of which the Senator was a member.
2 Senators are appointed to represent Manitoba. Each senator may choose to designate a geographic area within Manitoba as his or her division.
3 Senators are appointed by the Governor General of Canada on the recommendation of the Prime Minister.
4 Johnson was appointed as one of two senators under section 26 of the Constitution Act to represent the Western provinces, under the regional expansion clause that saw the Senate increase from 104 to 112 members.

Western provinces regional senators
Senators listed were appointed to represent the Western Provinces under section 26 of the Constitution Act. This clause has only been used once before to appoint two extra senators to represent four regional Senate divisions: Ontario, Quebec, the Maritimes and the Western Provinces.

As vacancies open up among the normal members of the Senate, they are automatically filled by the regional senators. Regional senators may also designate themselves to a senate division in any province of their choosing in their region.

Notes:

1 Party listed was the last party of which the senator was a member.
2 Senators are appointed to represent their region. Each senator may choose to designate a geographic area within their region as his or her division.
3 Senators are appointed by the Governor-General of Canada on the recommendation of the prime minister.

See also
Lists of Canadian senators

External links
Current Senators List Parliament Website
A Legislative  and Historical Overview of the Canadian Senate

 
Manitoba
Senators
Senators